Plushabridge is a hamlet in the parish of Linkinhorne in east  Cornwall, England.

References

Hamlets in Cornwall